Ribeira Seca (Portuguese for dry river) is a civil parish in the municipality of Ribeira Grande in the Portuguese archipelago of the Azores. The population in 2011 was 2,950, in an area of 12.59 km2. It is located near the north coast of the island. It contains the localities Bandejo, Morro de Cima and Ribeira Seca.

Architecture

The parish has a rich combination of modern and historical patrimony, in addition to natural spaces, such as the northern beach of Santa Bárbara, popular with surfers and watersports enthusiasts. These include:

Civic
 Manorhouse of Mafoma

Military
 Casamates of Santa Bárbara

Religious
 Church of São Pedro
 Hermitage of Mãe de Deus
 Hermitage of Nossa Senhora da Paciência
 Hermitage of Nossa Senhora da Quietação
 Hermitage of Bom Sucesso

Culture
The parish is traditionally the seat of the Cavalhadas de São Pedro, an event that occurs every 29 June, and celebrates the elevation oe Ribeira Grande to the status of city, with associated festivities. During the statutory holiday, the local residents prepare the Alâmpadas de São Pedro that decorate the roads and homes of the parish during this period. Preceding these events, on 28 June, is the Marchas de São Pedro, (Marches of St. Peter) that attract hundreds of participants, who parade through the parish.

References

Parishes of Ribeira Grande, Azores